Jim Rimmer (April 1, 1934  – January 9, 2010) was a Canadian graphic designer, letterpress printer, proprietor of the Pie Tree Press and is especially notable as a designer of typefaces.

Biography
Jim Rimmer was born on 1 April 1934 and was raised in Vancouver, British Columbia, Canada. He attended Vancouver Technical School, "which gave an introduction to metal type and presses through the school's large printing trade shop."

After an apprenticeship he began a long period of working with type and design for newspaper publication and printing, all in British Columbia. Rimmer attended evening classes to study graphic design at Vancouver School of Art. "During his freelance years he worked on projects for the major agencies and design studios in Vancouver, for corporations, airlines, mining and forestry companies. A large part of his work entailed letter design and lettering projects." Along with his long career as a designer, Rimmer taught at several colleges including Capilano College, ECIAD, Langara College, Kwantlen College, Richmond and UCFV, Abbotsford. For a brief time in the 1970s, Rimmer was type director of the Lanston Monotype Corporation in Vancouver.

Rimmer was noted as the proprietor of the Pie Tree Press, located in New Westminster, a printing office for which he designed many typefaces in metal, including Albertan, Kaatskill and Stern.

The P22 Type Foundry marketed Rimmer's typefaces as the Rimmer Type Foundry until July 1, 2012, when it was announced that the rights to Rimmer's work were acquired by Canada Type. Over 200 digital faces, distributed among 18 families, have been made from Rimmer's designs.

In 2007, Rimmer received the honor of becoming a fellow of the Society of Graphic Designers of Canada. In 2010, Rimmer was awarded the Robert R. Reid Award for lifetime achievement or extraordinary contributions to the book arts in Canada from the Alcuin Society.

Rimmer died of cancer on January 8, 2010.

Books
 Rimmer, Jim, Leaves from the Pie Tree Press, Pie Tree Press, 2006.

Further reading
 Richard Kegler, 'Remembering Jim Rimmer', in Parenthesis; 19 (2010 Autumn), p. 41-42

References

External links
 Rimmer Type Foundry at the P22 Type Foundry website
 Jim Rimmer typefaces at MyFonts
 "Celebrating Jim Rimmer's Magic," at Alcuin Society
 
 Portrait of Jim Rimmer – Linocut of Jim Rimmer by Andrea Taylor, from the UBC Library Digital Collections.
Records of Jim Rimmer and Pie Tree Press are held by Simon Fraser University's Special Collections and Rare Books

1934 births
2010 deaths
Deaths from cancer in British Columbia
Canadian graphic designers
Canadian typographers and type designers
Langara College people